The Travancore vine snake (Ahaetulla travancorica), is a species of tree snake endemic to the southern Western Ghats of India.

Taxonomy 
It was formerly considered conspecific with A. dispar (which is now considered to have a more northerly distribution in the Western Ghats), but a 2020 study found it to represent a new species.

Geographic range 
This species is endemic to the Agasthyamalai Hills of the southern Western Ghats in Tamil Nadu and Kerala. The specimen that the species was described from originates from a single locality in Peppara Wildlife Sanctuary. The Shencottah Gap north of the Agasthyamalais separates it from its closest relative, A. dispar.

Habitat 
This species is found in high-elevation shola forests in the Western Ghats above 1000 msl.

References 

Ahaetulla
Reptiles of India
Snakes of Asia
Endemic fauna of the Western Ghats
Reptiles described in 2020